The New Year Honours were appointments by King George V to various orders and honours to reward and highlight good works by citizens of the United Kingdom and British Empire. They were announced on 31 December 1926.

The recipients of honours are displayed here as they were styled before their new honour, and arranged by honour, with classes (Knight, Knight Grand Cross, etc.) and then divisions (Military, Civil, etc.) as appropriate.

United Kingdom and British Empire

Viscount
The Right Honourable Sir James Craig  Prime Minister of Northern Ireland. 
The Right Honourable John Andrew, Baron Sumner  Lord of Appeal in Ordinary.

Baron
Sir George Hayter Chubb  Chairman of Nonconformist Unionist Association since its foundation in 1886. For political and public services. 
Colonel Fiennes Stanley Wykeham Cornwallis  Member of Parliament for Maidstone, 1888–1895, and 1898–1900. Chairman of Kent County Council since 1910. For political and public services. 
Sir Charles Greenway  Chairman of the Anglo-Persian Oil Company. Ltd.

Privy Councillor
The King appointed the following to His Majesty's Most Honourable Privy Council:
The Honourable William George Arthur Ormsby-Gore  Under-Secretary of State for the Colonies, 1922–24, and since November, 1924. Member of Parliament for Denbigh District, 1910–18, and for Stafford since December, 1918. 
Sir Leslie Frederic Scott  Member of Parliament for the Exchange Division of Liverpool since 1910. Solicitor-General, March to October, 1922.

Baronetcies
Lieutenant-Colonel Edwin Bolton  Convener and Vice-Lieutenant of the County of Stirling. 
Sir Edward Rae Davson, President of the Associated West Indian Chambers of Commerce. 
Sir Joseph Duveen. For public services. 
Major George Richard James Hennessy  Vice-Chamberlain of the Household since December, 1925. Lord Commissioner of the Treasury, 1923 to January, 1924, and November, 1924 to December, 1925. Member of Parliament for Winchester since 1918. 
Sir John Scott Hindley, Commercial Adviser, Mines Department since 1918. For public services. 
William Lewthwaite  Chairman of the Conservative Association for the Egremont (now Whitehaven) Division of Cumberland, 1904–1924, and Treasurer for many years previous to 1904. For political and public services. 
Basil Edward Peto  Member of Parliament for Devizes, 1910–18; Barnstaple, 1922–23 and since 1924. For political and public services.

Knight Bachelor
Major Richard Ludwig Bagge  For political and public services in Norfolk. 
George William Barber  Chairman of the Twickenham Division Conservative Association. For political and public services in Middlesex.
Alderman Percival Bower  Lord Mayor of Birmingham, 1924–26. 
William Henry Clarke  For political and public services in Leeds. 
George Hammond Etherton  Clerk to the Lancashire County Council and formerly Town Clerk of Liverpool. 
Henry Head  For public services. Has made distinguished contributions to knowledge of the nervous system. 
Thomas Houston  For public services. 
Ebenezer Howard  President, International Garden Cities and Town Planning Association. 
Charles Hulbert, Chief Master, Chancery Division of the Supreme Court cf Judicature. 
Alfred Joseph Law  For political and public services in Lancashire. 
Walter Greaves-Lord  Member of Parliament for Norwood since November, 1922. For political and public services. 
Alderman Percy Molyneux  For political and public services in Wales. 
Harold Spencer Morris  President of the Industrial Court. 
Charles Kenneth Murchison  Member of Parliament for East Hull December, 1918–22; Huntingdon 1922-23 and since 1924. For political and public services. 
The Right Honourable Thomas Lopdell O'Shaughnessy  Retired Irish Judge. For public services. 
George Allan Powell  Vice-Chairman of the Food Council. 
Joseph Child Priestley  Chairman of the Herts Quarter Sessions. For public services. 
John Charles Walsham Reith, Managing Director of the British Broadcasting Company. 
Thomas Wakelin Saint  For political and public services. Chairman of the East Islington Conservative Association and has been leader of the Municipal Reform Party in Islington for many years. 
John James Smith. For political and public services in Essex. 
Alexander Spence  President of the Dundee Unionist Association and lately Lord Provost of the City. For political and public services in Dundee. 
Lionel Alexander Goodenough Taylor. For political and public services in Bristol. 
Charles John Howell Thomas  Chief Valuer, Board of Inland Revenue 
David Milne-Watson  Governor of the Gas Light and Coke Company.
Duncan Watson  Chairman of the London and Home Counties Joint Electricity Authority. 
James Watt  President and formerly Chairman of the Carlisle Conservative Association. For political and public services. 
Walter James Franklin Williamson  late Financial Adviser to Siamese Government.

Colonies, Protectorates, etc.
The Honourable John Bowser, Speaker of the Legislative Assembly, State of Victoria. 
The Honourable Hal Pateshall Colebatch  Agent-General in London for the State of Western Australia. 
John Joseph Garvan, formerly Chairman of the Board of Directors of the Commonwealth Bank of Australia. 
Alfred Langler, Governing Director of the West Australian Newspaper Company, in recognition of his services to the Commonwealth of Australia. 
Robert Donald Douglas Maclean, in recognition of his services to the Dominion of New Zealand. 
Maurice Julian Berkeley, Senior Puisne Judge, British Guiana. 
Honorary Colonel Edwin James Hayward  Unofficial Member of the Legislative Council of Ceylon. 
Joseph Horsford Kemp  Attorney-General, Hong Kong. 
Albert Ernest Kitson  Director of the Geological Survey, Gold Coast Colony. 
Herbert Kortwright McDonnell Sisnett, Chief Justice of British Honduras.

British India
Joseph Augustus Maung Gyi, Member of the Executive Council of the Governor of Burma. 
Richard Burn  Indian Civil Service, lately temporary Member of the Executive Council of the Governor of the United Provinces. 
Justice Cheruvari Krishnan, Diwan Bahadur, Puisne Judge of the High Court of Judicature, Madras. 
John William Anderson Bell, President, Bengal Chamber of Commerce. 
David Thomas Chadwick  Indian Civil Service, lately Secretary to the Government of India in the Commerce Department. 
Norman Mclver Murray, Managing Governor of the Imperial Bank of India. 
Sardar Bomanji Ardeshir Dalai, Member of the Legislative Assembly, First Class Sardar, Bombay. 
Joseph Aspden Kay, Member of the Bombay Legislative Council, Managing Director, Messrs. W. H. Brady and Company, Limited, Bombay. 
Rao Bahadur Ramanbhai Mahipatram Nilkanth, Bombay.

The Most Honourable Order of the Bath

Knight Grand Cross of the Order of the Bath (GCB)

Military Division
Army
General Sir George Francis Milne  General to the King, Colonel Commandant, Royal Artillery, Chief of the Imperial General Staff, The War Office.

Civil Division
Sir Claud Schuster  Permanent Secretary to the Lord Chancellor and Clerk of the Crown.

Knight Commander of the Order of the Bath (KCB)
Military Division
Royal Navy
Lieutenant General Alexander Richard Hamilton Hutchison  Royal Marines.

Army
Lieutenant-General Sir William Thwaites  General Officer Command.ing, 47th (2nd London) Division. 
Lieutenant-General Sir Webb Gillman  Inspector of the Royal Artillery, The War Office. 
Major-General Harry Christopher Tytler  Indian Army, General Officer Commanding, Burma Independent District.

Civil Division
George Macdonald  Secretary to the Scottish Education Department

Companion of the Order of the Bath (CB)
Military Division
Royal Navy
Rear-Admiral William Rawdon Napier 
Rear-Admiral Humphrey Wykeham Bowring 
Engineer Captain Walter Rudolph Parnall 

Army
Colonel (Local Colonel on the Staff) Charles Walker Scott  Colonel in charge of Administration, Gibraltar. 
Colonel (temporary Colonel Commandant) Evan Gibb  Assistant Director of Supplies and Transport, Aldershot Command. 
Colonel (temporary Colonel Commandant) Charles Howard Foulkes  Chief Engineer, Aldershot Command. 
Colonel Austin Claude Girdwood  Brigade Commander, 158th (Royal Welch) Infantry Brigade. 
Ordnance Officer 1st Class and Colonel Robert Henry McVittie  Royal Army Ordnance Corps, Assistant Director of Ordnance Services, The British Troops in Egypt. 
Colonel (temporary Colonel on the Staff) Sydney Capel Peck  Director of Artillery, The War Office. 
Colonel Walter Edward Wilson-Johnston  Indian Army, General Staff Officer 1st Grade, India Office. 
Colonel (temporary Colonel Commandant) Cyril Rodney Harbord  Indian Army, Brigade Commander, 2nd Indian Cavalry Brigade, Sialkot, India. 
Colonel Corrie Hudson  Indian Medical Service, Assistant Director of Medical Services, Aden Brigade, Aden.

Royal Air Force
Group Captain Charles Stuart Burnett 

Civil Division
Rear-Admiral Arthur John Davies. 
Instructor Captain Thomas Slator  
Commander Kenneth Noel Humphreys  
Charles John Tench Bedford Grylls  Commissioner and Joint Secretary, H.M. Board of Customs & Excise. 
James Frederick George Price, Principal Assistant Secretary, Ministry of Labour. 
Henry Thomas Tizard  Principal Assistant Secretary, Department of Scientific and Industrial Research.

The Most Exalted Order of the Star of India

Knight Commander (KCSI)
His Highness Maharaja Gulab Singh Bahadur, Maharaja of Rewa, Central India.

Companion (CSI)
Archibald Young Gipps Campbell  Indian Civil Service, Chief Secretary to Government, Madras. 
Lieutenant-Colonel Stewart Blakeley Agnew Patterson  Indian Army, Political Department, Agent to the Governor General in Rajputana. 
John Thomas Marten, Indian Civil Service Member of the Executive Council of the Governor of the Central Provinces. 
Blanchard Foley, Indian Civil Service, Member of the Board of Revenue, Bihar and Orissa. 
Alexander Langley  Indian Civil Service, Commission, Lahore, Punjab.

The Most Distinguished Order of Saint Michael and Saint George

Knight Grand Cross of the Order of St Michael and St George (GCMG)

Colonel Henry Lawson Webster, Viscount Burnham  President of the Empire Press Union and Deputy Chairman of the Empire Parliamentary Association. 
Sir Laurence Nunns Guillemard  Governor and Commander-in-Chief of the Straits Settlements and their Dependencies; High Commissioner for the Malay States.

Honorary Knight Grand Cross
His Majesty King Faisal of Iraq.

Knight Commander of the Order of St Michael and St George (KCMG)

Professor William Mitchell, Vice-Chancellor of the University of Adelaide, in recognition of his services to the Commonwealth of Australia. 
The Honourable Charles Perrin Skerrett, Chief Justice of New Zealand. 
Alfred Claud Hollis  British Resident in Zanzibar.
Sir William Kellman Chandler  Member of the Executive Council and President of the Legislative Council of the Island of Barbados. 
Aretas, Viscount Chilston  His Majesty's Envoy Extraordinary and Minister Plenipotentiary at Vienna. 
Robert Henry Clive  His Majesty's Envoy Extraordinary and Minister Plenipotentiary at Tehran. 
Miles Wedderburn Lampson  His Majesty's Envoy Extraordinary and Minister Plenipotentiary at Peking. 
Charles Hubert Montgomery  Assistant Under-Secretary of State, Foreign Office.

Companion of the Order of St Michael and St George (CMG)

John Alexander of the City of Auckland, in recognition of his services to the Dominion of New Zealand. 
Alexander Foulis Bell, a Member of the Dried Fruits Control Board, Commonwealth of Australia. 
Captain Lawrence Franklin Burgis  Principal, Offices of the Cabinet.
Charles John Cerutty, Auditor-General of the Commonwealth of Australia. 
Charles Westwood Earle, President of the New Zealand Newspaper Proprietors' Association.
Edward Maltby Bland, General Manager of the Nigerian Railway. 
Ernest Frederick Colvile, Provincial Commissioner, Nyasaland Protectorate. Member of the Executive Council and an Official Member of the Legislative Council of the Protectorate. 
Lieutenant-Colonel Charles Henry Fortnom Cox  Chief British Representative in Trans-Jordan. 
John Pierce Hand  Member of the Executive Council and Member of the House of Assembly of Bermuda. represented the Colony at the Trade Conference at Ottawa, 1925. 
Arthur Selborne Jelf, Colonial Secretary of Jamaica. 
Robert Hormus Kotewall  Unofficial Member of the Legislative Council of Hong Kong. 
George Nevile Maltby Bland, Private Secretary to the Permanent Under-Secretary of State, Foreign Office.
William Stanley Edmonds  Consul-General attached, with the local rank of First Secretary, to His Majesty's Embassy in Turkey. 
Horace Courtenay Forbes Finlayson, Financial Adviser to His Majesty's Embassy at Berlin. 
Arthur James Croft Huddleston  Governor of the Blue Nile Province, Sudan. 
Horace James Seymour, First Secretary at His Majesty's Embassy at Rome. 
George Redston Warner, Counsellor in the Foreign Office.

Order of the Indian Empire

Knight Commander (KCIE)

William Pell Barton  Indian Civil Service, Political Department, Resident at Hyderabad.

Companion (CIE)

Howard Denning, Indian Civil Service, Controller of the Currency, Calcutta, Bengal. 
William Browne Brander  Indian Civil Service, Chief Secretary to Government, Burma. 
George Washington Hatch, Indian Civil Service, Commissioner, Central Division, Bombay. 
Cecil Upton Wills, Indian Civil Service, Commissioner, Nagpur Division, Central Provinces. 
Herbert Allardyce Lane, Indian Civil Service, Revenue and Judicial Secretary to Government, United Provinces. 
Kaikhosru Sorabji Framji, Acting Chief Engineer and Joint Secretary to Government, Public Works Department, Bombay. 
Colonel William Harry Evans  Deputy Chief Engineer, Northern Command. 
George Ernest Fawcus  Director of Public Instruction, Bihar and Orissa. 
Frank Armitage, Inspector-General of Police, Madras. 
Trevor Claude Simpson, Inspector-General of Police, Bengal. 
Lieutenant-Colonel Alexander Charles Tancock, Indian Army, Inspecting Officer. Frontier Corps, North-West Frontier Province. 
Brevet Lieutenant-Colonel Henry Lawrence Haughton, 11th Sikhs, Commandant, Prince of Wales Royal Indian Military College, Dehra Dun. 
Lieutenant-Colonel Hannath Douglas Marshall  Aide-de-Camp, Commandant. Surma Valley Light Horse, Silchar, Assam.
Henry Duncan Graves Law, Indian Civil Service, His. Majesty's Consul at Kerman, Persian Gulf. 
Rupert Willoughby Hanson, Postmaster-General, Madras Circle. 
Hector Russell Wilkinson, Indian Civil Service, Private Secretary to His Excellency the Governor of Bengal. 
Lieutenant-Colonel John Wolfran Cornwall  Indian Medical Service, lately Director, Southern India Pasteur Institute, Coonoor, India. 
Rudolph David Anstead, Director of Agriculture, Madras. 
David Milne, Director of Agriculture, Punjab. 
William Roche, Executive Engineer, Public Works Department, United Provinces. 
Rai Biswambhar Rai Bahadur  Government Pleader, Krishnagar, Nadia District, Bengal. 
Rai Tara Prasanna Mukharji Bahadur, Pleader, Vice-Chairman of the Burdwan District Board, Bengal. 
Gopal Krishna Devadhar, Vice-President of the Servants of India Society, Bombay. 
Chaudhri Chhaju Ram, of Alakhpura, Hissar District, Punjab.

The Royal Victorian Order

Knight Grand Cross of the Royal Victorian Order (GCVO)

The Right Honourable Rowland Thomas, Earl of Cromer

Knight Commander of the Royal Victorian Order (KCVO)

Colonel Rudolph Robert Basil, Earl of Denbigh  
Sir Arthur Stockdale Cope 
Brigadier-General Ernest Frederick Orby Gascoigne 
Captain Ernest Beachcroft Beckwith Towse

Commander of the Royal Victorian Order (CVO)

Major-General Carteret Walter Carey  
Major Eric Henry Bonham  Scots Greys (Retired). (Dated 29 July 1926.) 
The Rev. Canon Ernest Edward Holmes, Archdeacon of London. 
Major Berkeley John Talbot Levett, Scots Guards (Retired). (Dated 12 October 1926.)

Member of the Royal Victorian Order, 4th class (MVO)

Paymaster Commander Herbert Martyn Boxer  (Dated 9 August 1926.) 
John Henry Follows 
Arthur William Heasman 
Lieutenant Walter Douglas Campbell Greenacre, Welsh Guards. 
Lieutenant Commander William Vesey Hamilton Harris,  (Dated 9 August 1926.) 
Colonel Walter Frederick Kelsey.

Member of the Royal Victorian Order, 5th class (MVO)
William Macintosh (Dated 9 September 1926.) 
George Harry Williams

The Most Excellent Order of the British Empire

Dame Commander of the Order of the British Empire (DBE)

Margaret Elizabeth, Dowager Countess of Jersey  President, Victoria League. For Imperial services.

Commander of the Order of the British Empire (CBE)

Civil Division
Sarah Boyce. For political and public services in Surrey. 
Margaret Hardinge Irwin, General Secretary, Scottish Council for Women's Trades. 
Grace Thyrza Kimmins, Founder and Honorary Secretary of the Heritage Craft School for Crippled Children. 
Katharine Janie Stephenson  Vice-Chairman, Public Health Committee, Wiltshire County Council. 
Eugénie Strong. For services to Archaeology. 
Alice Edith Vlieland. For political and public services in Exeter. 
Anna Elisa Wark, Chief Woman Inspector, Board of Education.

Officer of the Order of the British Empire (OBE)

Civil Division
Hilda Maud Milsom, Principal Clerk in His Majesty's Private Secretary's Office.
Margaret Polson, Superintending Clerk (acting), Ministry of Health.

Members of the Order of the Companions of Honour (CH) 

The Reverend Hugh Richard Lawrie Sheppard  Honorary Chaplain to The King and lately Vicar of St Martins-in-the-Fields.

Kaisar-i-Hind Medal
First Class

Lenna Mary Stratford  Deputy Directress of Public Instruction, Punjab. 
The Reverend William Herbert Greenland Padfield, Principal and Secretary, Lawrence Memorial Royal Military School, Lovedale, Madras. 
The Reverend John Harvey Hickinbotham, Missionary, Principal, King Edward School, Chapra, Krishnanagar, Bengal. 
The Reverend William Edwin Lant, Superintendent of the Leper Home and Hospital at Dichpalli, Hyderabad. 
Rose Harvey, Superintendent of the Nasik Leper Asylum, Bombay. 
Henry Campbell Guyer, Principal, Church Mission School, Dera Ismail Khan, North-West Frontier Province 
The Reverend Edward Charles Stephens, Honorary Secretary, Strangers Home for Asiatics, London. 
Frances Whipham, Missionary, Bihar and Orissa. 
Helen Dorothea Jerwood, Missionary, Cambridge Mission, Delhi. 
Parvati Ammal Chandirasekhara Aiyar, Mysore.

Air Force Cross

Flight Lieutenant Louis Massey Hilton 
Flight Lieutenant Matthew Crawford Dick.

Air Force Medal
Sergeant (Pilot) Herbert Myles. 
Corporal Arthur East 
Leading Aircraftman Robert Edward Barton. 
Leading Aircraftman Stanley George Wright.

King's Police Medal (KPM)

England and Wales
James Billings  Chief Constable, Metropolitan Police. 
Robert Yarnell Davies  Chief Constable of Flint. 
Lieutenant-Colonel Henry William Madoc  Chief Constable of the Isle of Man. 
James Arthur Wilson  Chief Constable, Cardiff City Police. 
James Main Garrow, Assistant Chief Constable, Derbyshire Constabulary. 
Arthur Fowler Neil, Superintendent, Metropolitan Police. 
Alfred John Minty, Superintendent, West Riding Constabulary. 
Henry Tebbey, Superintendent, Northampton.shire Constabulary. 
Levi Bowley, Superintendent and Deputy Chief Constable, Leicestershire Constabulary. 
Ralph John Smith  Superintendent and Deputy Chief Constable, Nottinghamshire Constabulary. 
John Hernaman Boulton  Chief Superintendent, Birmingham City Police. 
Frederick Joseph Dewen, Superintendent, Hull City Police. 
Thomas Herbert Wardle, Sergeant, Lancashire Constabulary. 
Wallace Wood, Constable, Metropolitan Police. 
Alfred Green. Constable, Metropolitan Police. 
Alexander Cunningham, Constable, Metropolitan Police.
Leslie Lyddon, Constables Metropolitan Police.
Christopher Jones, Constable, Metropolitan Police. 
George Thompson Cockill, Constable, Leeds City Police. 
Cyril MacLachlan, Constable, Manchester City Police. 
George Rigby Southern, Constable, Manchester City Police. 
George Creamer, Constable, Durham Constabulary. 
William. James, Constable, Lancashire Constabulary. 
Samuel Pope, Constable, Boston Borough Police. 
John Jones, Sergeant, Wigan Borough Police Fire Brigade (For a Bar to the Kings Police Medal.)
Albert Victor Armstrong, Sub-Officer. London Fire Brigade. 
Willie Rylance, Inspector, Wigan Borough Police Fire Brigade. 
John Farmery  Superintendent, Ilford Fire Brigade. 
John Richard Exall, Second Officer, West Ham Fire Brigade.

Scotland
Auchterlonie Williamson, Assistant Chief Constable, Glasgow City Police. 
John Forbes, Superintendent, Glasgow City Police. 
James Dick Gracie, Superintendent, Lanark County Police.

Northern Ireland
George Storey, Head Constable, Royal Ulster Constabulary, Belfast. 
William Robert Coulson, Sergeant, Royal Ulster Constabulary, Co. Down.

Australia
Thomas Pierce Hains Nance, Deputy Chief Officer, Board of Fire Commissioners, New South Wales.

Union of South Africa
Hermanus Christiaan Bredell, Deputy Commissioner, South African Police. 
John James McRae, Inspector, South African Police. 
Peter Villet, First Class Detective Sergeant, South African Police. 
Pieter Blomerus Phillipus Fourie, First Class Constable, South African Police.

British India
Rao Bahadur Kanthadaa Rangaswami Ayyangar, Temporary Deputy Superintendent, Madras Police. (For a Bar to the Kings Police Medal.)
Shanmukham Pillai Duraiswami Pillai, Sub-Inspector, Madras Police. (For a Bar to the Kings Police Medal.)
Frederick Sayers, Superintendent, Madras Police. 
Kuvalavalli South Rajagopala Ayyangar, Acting Deputy Superintendent, Madras Police. 
Codanda Mediah Biddiah, Inspector, Madras Police. 
Baburao Ramchandra Ashtekar, Sub-Inspector, Bombay Police. 
Khamiso, Mounted Police Constable, Acting Head Constable, Bombay Police. 
Khan Bahadur Abdul Rashid Khan, District Superintendent, Bombay Police. 
Satyendra Nath Mukerjee, Sub-Inspector, Calcutta Police. 
Robin Neil, Sergeant, Calcutta Police. 
George John Adamson, Sergeant, Calcutta Police. 
David Fisher, Assistant Commissioner, Calcutta Police. 
Frank Austin Tucker, Station Officer, Calcutta Fire Brigade. 
Eric Prideaux Mclntosh  Superintendent, United Provinces Police. 
Thakur Raghunath Singh, Sub-Inspector, United Provinces Police. 
Allah Rakha, Head Constable, Punjab Police. 
Geoffrey Bernard Sandeman Prance, Officiating Superintendent, Punjab Police. 
Dawindar Singh, Sub-Inspector, Punjab Police. 
Pir Nabi Shah, Sub-Inspector, Punjab Police. 
Captain Alleyn Cardwell Moore  Assistant Commandant, Burma Military Police. 
Havildar Shuan Kam, Burma Military Police. 
Havildar Budhiman Thapa  Burma Military Police.
Lieutenant-Colonel Roderick William MacDonald  Inspector General, Burma Police. 
Matthew Spencer Merrikin, Officiating Deputy Inspector General, Burma Police. 
Daniel David, Officiating Superintendent, Burma Police. 
U Maung Gale (1), Superintendent, Burma Police. 
William Surridge Hitchcock, Superintendent, Bihar and Orissa Police. 
Maulavi Shah Anisur Rahman, Probationary Sub-Inspector, Bihar and Orissa Police. 
Bam Kishun Thakur, Constable, Bihar and Orissa Police. 
Chammdass, Constable, Central Provinces Police. 
Tarachand, Inspector, Central Provinces Police. 
Rai Sahib Surendra Nath Sen, Inspector, Officiating Deputy Superintendent, Assam Police. 
Thomas Andrew, North West Frontier Province Police. 
Denis Brownell Murphy, Assistant Superintendent, North West Frontier Province Police. 
Mohammad Bakhsh, Foot Constable, North West Frontier Province Police. 
Agha Mirza Jan, Sub-Inspector, Baluchistan Police. 
Archibald John O'Connor, Superintendent, Baluchistan Police. 
Sardar Bahadur Tara Chand, Inspector General, Patiala State Police.

Colonies, Protectorates and Mandated Territories 
Richard Charles Alexander Cavendish, Commissioner of Police, Nigeria.
George William Richardson, Quartermaster, Kenya Police. 
Major Francis Trent Stephens  Chief Commissioner of Police, Nyasaland Protectorate. 
Jese, Constable, Fiji Constabulary. 
Kok Ah Soo, Detective Police Constable, Straits Settlements. 
Chong Soo, Detective Police Constable, Straits Settlements. 
Hong Ah Heng, Detective Police Constable, Straits Settlements. 
Hernam Singh, Sergeant, Federated Malay States Police. 
Wahat bin Salim, Lance Sergeant, Federated Malay States Police. 
Charles Hannigan, Commissioner of Police, Federated Malay States.

Royal Red Cross (RRC) 
First Class
Mary Wilson Campbell, late Matron, Princess Mary's Royal Air Force Nursing Service, in recognition of the exceptional devotion and competency displayed by her in the nursing and care of the sick in Air Force Hospitals at Home and in Iraq.

References

New Year Honours
1927 in Australia
1927 in Canada
1927 in India
1927 in New Zealand
1927 in the United Kingdom
1927 awards